The 2018 Ohio Valley Conference women's basketball tournament ended the 2017–18 season of Ohio Valley Conference women's basketball. The tournament was held February 28–March 3 at Ford Center in Evansville, Indiana. Regular-season champion Belmont won the tournament and with it the OVC's automatic berth in the NCAA tournament.

Format
The OVC women's tournament is a traditional single-elimination tournament featuring the top eight teams in the conference regular-season standings. This differs from the format used in the OVC men's tournament; while that tournament also involves only eight of the league's 12 members, it has a radically different format, consisting of two stepladder brackets that produce the tournament finalists. The women's tournament is seeded so that the #8 seed faces the #1 seed in the first round, #7 faces #2, and so on. There is no reseeding, so if the #8 team were to defeat the #1 seed it would continue in the tournament playing the team which would have faced the #1 seed in the subsequent round (winner of #4 vs. #5).

Seeds

Bracket
 All times central. Television

References

Ohio Valley Conference women's basketball tournament
Basketball competitions in Evansville, Indiana
2017–18 Ohio Valley Conference women's basketball season
Ohio Valley Conference women's basketball tournament
Ohio Valley Conference women's basketball tournament
College basketball tournaments in Indiana